Georges Huisman (1889 - 1957) was a French historian and politician who served as the Jury President of the Cannes Film Festival from 1946 to 1949. He also served as the mayor of Valmondois from 1932 to 1939.

He founded the Cannes Film Festival at the behest of the French Prime Minister Jean Zay. Their goal was to create a film festival that would rival the prestige of the Venice Film Festival.

Biography 

He was born in Valenciennes on 03 May 1889. He graduated with a degree in history from the École Nationale des Chartes. He died on 28 December 1957 in Paris.

Career  

He served as the Jury President of the Cannes Film Festival from 1946 to 1949.

He also served as the mayor of Valmondois from 1932 to 1939. He also served as the director of the Administration of Fine Arts.

Throughout his career, he held various positions in the French Government. However, after the defeat of France in the Second World War, he was relieved of his responsibilities by the Vichy Regime.

See also 

 Cannes Film Festival
 Academie Francaise

References

External links 
 Academie Francaise
 Biography

French historians
French politicians
Cannes Film Festival